, sometimes abbreviated as LOTGH, LOGH, LGH or  in Japanese (and also depicted as Heldensagen vom Kosmosinsel in the anime intro), is a series of science fiction novels written by Yoshiki Tanaka. In humanity's distant future, two interstellar states – the monarchic Galactic Empire and the democratic Free Planets Alliance – are embroiled in a never-ending war. The story focuses on the exploits of rivals Reinhard von Lohengramm and Yang Wen-li, as they rise to power and fame in the Galactic Empire and the Free Planets Alliance, respectively.

An anime adaptation of the novels, produced by Kitty Films, ran from 1988 to 1997. There is also a manga based on the novels, with art by Katsumi Michihara. In addition, there are several video game adaptations, with the most recent release in 2008 being a real-time strategy game. The series did not receive an official English release until 2015, when North American anime and manga distributor Viz Media announced they had acquired the license to the novels. On the same day, North American anime licensor Sentai Filmworks announced their license to the anime; the anime was later released on Hidive in 2017. A new anime adaptation by Production I.G is being released since 2018.

Setting
In AD 2801, the Galactic Federation is formed, resulting in political power moving away from the planet Earth (now named Terra) and the Space Era calendar replacing the Gregorian calendar, with 2801 AD now being SE 1. Rudolf von Goldenbaum, an ex-admiral turned dictatorial politician, is elected to power. After declaring himself Emperor Rudolf I, absolute monarch of the renamed Galactic Empire, he restarts the calendar again, beginning the Imperial Calendar on SE 310/AD 3110. His regime adopts extremist policies, including the suppression of any opposition and the extermination of anyone perceived too weak (such as the disabled and the poor), which is carried out until his death in IC 42/SE 351/AD 3151. He also moves the capital of the Empire to the planet Odin, the third planet in the Valhalla system.

In IC 164/SE 473/AD 3273, a group of serfs in the Altair star system manage to escape captivity and make "the Long March of 10,000 Light-Years" into the Sagittarius Arm to escape the Galactic Empire, located within the Orion Arm. These people set up the Free Planets Alliance, a democratic republic which uses the Space Era calendar, founding the Alliance in SE 527/IC 218/AD 3327 on the planet Heinessen. In SE 640/IC 331/AD 3440, the first battle between the Empire and Alliance occurs, resulting in a major Alliance victory. The two realms have been at war ever since.

A third realm is also set up, the Dominion of Phezzan, a planet-state (city-state on a galactic scale) with connections to Terra. It technically remains a part of the Empire and pays tribute, but also maintains a relationship with the Alliance. Ruled by a domain lord called the "landsherr", Phezzan gains power by acting as both paragon and trickster, providing the only link between the Empire and Alliance, while simultaneously playing the two sides against one another.

Plot

The story is staged in the distant future within our own Milky Way Galaxy, starting in SE 796/IC 487/AD 3596. A portion of the galaxy is filled with terraformed worlds, inhabited by interstellar traveling human beings. For 150 years, two mighty space powers have intermittently warred with each other: the Galactic Empire and the Free Planets Alliance.

Within the Galactic Empire, based on mid-19th-century Prussia, an ambitious military genius, Reinhard von Müsel, later conferred the name Reinhard von Lohengramm, is rising to power. He is driven by the desire to free his sister Annerose, who was taken by the Kaiser as a concubine. Later, he wants not only to end the corrupt Goldenbaum dynasty, but also to defeat the Free Planets Alliance and unify the whole galaxy under his rule.

In the Free Planets Alliance Star Fleet is another genius, Yang Wen-li. He originally aspired to become a historian through a military academy, and joined the tactical division only out of need for tuition money. He was rapidly promoted to commodore because he demonstrated excellence in military strategy in a number of decisive battles and conflicts. He becomes the arch-rival of Reinhard, though they highly respect one another. Unlike Reinhard, he is better known for his underdog victories and accomplishments in overcoming seemingly impossible odds and mitigating collateral damages and casualties due to military operations.

As a historian, Yang often predicts the motives behind his enemies, narrating the rich history of his world and offering commentary. One of his famous quotes is "There are few wars between good and evil; most are between one good and another good."

Besides the two main heroes, the story is full of vivid characters and intricate politics. All types of characters – from high nobility, admirals, and politicians, to common soldiers and farmers – are interwoven into the story. The story frequently switches away from the main heroes to the Unknown Soldier fighting for his life on the battlefield.

There is a third neutral power nominally attached to the Galactic Empire, the Phezzan Dominion, a planet-state that trades with both warring powers. There is also a Terraism cult, which believes that humans should go back to Earth, gaining popularity throughout the galaxy. Throughout the story, executive political figures of Phezzan, in concert with the upper-hierarchy of the Terraism cult, orchestrate a number of conspiracies to shift the tide of the galactic war to favor their objectives. The name "Phezzan" is a reference to Fezzan, a region of modern Libya that played an analogous historical role to the one in the anime.

Christopher Farris of the Anime News Network wrote that the novels focus on "personal matters of the main players" instead of being "rote historical accounts", while the 1988-1997 anime series focuses on "the big picture of the war", with multiple characters chronicled, and the 2018 series focuses "only on the major plays by our two main actors to fit within its shorter, more focused format."

Media

Novels
The series proper is based on a ten-novel series written by Yoshiki Tanaka, as well as a number of other shorter stories set in the same universe. It won the Seiun Award for "Best Novel of the Year" in 1988. On July 2, 2015, Viz Media had announced that it had licensed the novels for release in North America under their Haikasoru imprint. The company had only initially licensed the first three novels, but stated that it would license more if sales are good. The first novel, Dawn, was released on March 8, 2016. The company eventually licensed and released all the novels, and the final volume, Sunset, was released on November 19, 2019. The novels were translated by Daniel Huddleston, Tyran Grillo and Matt Treyvaud. First three novels were also released as audiobooks.

Anime

My Conquest is the Sea of Stars
 is the first animated adaptation of Yoshiki Tanaka's Legend of the Galactic Heroes series of novels. It was originally released in Japan on 6 February 1988. The film chronicles the first combat encounter between Reinhard von Müsel (who later adopted the Lohengramm name) and Yang Wen-li, the two primary protagonists of the series. The main original video animation (OVA) series followed only months later.

Legend of the Galactic Heroes

 is the second and longest-running animated adaptation of Tanaka's series of novels. It was released in direct home video installments during four separate periods between December 1988 and March 1997. The OVA comprises 110 episodes. It was later shown on television and has seen multiple releases on both DVD and Blu-ray formats. It is also known by the (grammatically incorrect) German title Heldensagen vom Kosmosinsel, which is used in its opening credits.

Golden Wings
 is the third animated adaptation of Tanaka's novels. It was originally released on home video in Japan in October 1992, then released in cinemas in December of that year. Its art style is notable in that it follows the art style of the Katsumi Michihara's manga rather than the other animated works. Its ending theme song is "Futari Mita Yume ~Two of Us~", performed and composed by Hiroyuki Matsuda, written by Gorou Matsui, and arranged by David Campbell.

Overture to a New War
 is the fourth animated adaptation of Tanaka's novels. It was originally released in Japan on 18 December 1993. It expands upon the events covered in the first two episodes of the 1988 OVA series.

Gaiden
 is the fifth animated adaptation (counting films) of Tanaka's novel series. It was originally released in Japan between February 1998 and July 2000. It served as a prequel to the main series.

Series 1, released in 1998, is the first animated adaptation of the Legend of the Galactic Heroes Gaiden, or side stories, series of novels, consisting of adaptations of the short stories "Silver-White Valley", "Dream of the Morning, Song of Night", "Disgrace", and the novel A Hundred Billion Stars, a Hundred Billion Lights.

Series 2, released between December 1999 and June 2000, is the second animated adaptation of the side stories from the Legend of the Galactic Heroes series of novels, consisting of the adaptations of the novels Spiral Labyrinth and part of The Star Crusher ("The Third Tiamat Battle"), as well as the original stories "The Mutineer", "The Duellist", and "The Retriever".

Die Neue These
 started being produced by Production I.G during 2017. Shunsuke Tada directed the series and Noboru Takagi supervised the scripts. Yoko Kikuchi, Iwao Teraoka, and Katsura Tsushima designed the characters. The mecha designs by Naoyuki Kato were drafted by Atsushi Takeuchi, Shinji Usui, and Shinobu Tsuneki. DMM Pictures, Shochiku, and Tokuma Shoten were credited with production of the anime, alongside Production I.G. The anime stars Mamoru Miyano as Reinhard von Lohengramm, Kenichi Suzumura as Yang Wen-li, and Yuichiro Umehara as Siegfried Kircheis. The series premiered from April 3 to June 26, 2018, and ran for 12 episodes. The opening theme is "Binary Star" by SawanoHiroyuki[nZk]:Uru, and the ending theme is "Wish" by Elisa.

A second season,  premiered in Japanese theaters as three films, each with four episodes, in 2019. The films premiered on September 27, October 25, and November 29, 2019, respectively. The ending theme for the films is "Tranquility" by SawanoHiroyuki[nZk]:Anly. It was broadcast on TV with a reairing of the first season in 2020.

A third season,  premiered in Japanese theaters as a three-part film series in 2022 on March 4, April 1, and May 13, respectively. The opening theme for the films is "dust" by SennaRin, while the ending theme is "melt" by SennaRin.

A fourth season,  premiered in Japanese theaters as a three-part film series in 2022 on September 30, October 28, and November 25, respectively.

English-language release
An English dub pilot was produced by Outis Productions and Ocean Productions in 1999. The dubbed episodes were the episodes 51 and 52. The dub was never picked up due to a lack of interest.

On 2 July 2015, Sentai Filmworks announced their license to the anime series at their panel at Anime Expo, and later commented that they hoped to create the "definitive release".

On 20 June 2017, Sentai Filmworks announced the streaming release on Hidive's anime streaming service starting the same day.

Manga
The first manga adaptation was authored by Katsumi Michihara, and adapts the first two volumes of the original novel. It was published from 1986 to 2000, and collected in eleven volumes. A four-volume continuation, Legend of the Galactic Heroes: Portrait of Heroes, was published from 2006 to 2012. This manga story is faithful to the original, possibly more faithful than the anime. However, there are some changes that could be considered major, e.g. the gender of several characters is changed. Akira Kasahara cooperated in drawing mechanics. Michihara also adapted the side story "Golden Wings" into a one-shot manga of the same name in August 1986.

A manga adaptation by Ryu Fujisaki started in Shueisha's Weekly Young Jump on October 8, 2015. The manga was transferred to Ultra Jump on February 19, 2020. Shueisha has compiled its chapters into individual tankōbon volumes, with the first volume being released on February 19, 2016. As of August 19, 2022, 24 volumes have been published.

Stage productions
In 2012, the series was adapted as a musical by the all-female performance troupe Takarazuka Revue.

In February 2014, the most recent stage production of Legend of the Galactic Heroes opened, and it ended with an announcement of a new anime adaptation. Tanaka's secretary, Hirofumi Adachi, confirmed the news and relayed the producer's comments that the new anime is not a remake of the earlier anime, but another anime adaptation of the original novels with a new staff.

Reception and legacy
The series received several reviews in English media, years or even decades before its official release.

The English debut of the novel series in 2016 was described as long-awaited and overdue. Publishers Weekly criticized the Daniel Huddleston's translation of the first novel, Dawn, stating it was "a slog". The novel as-a-whole was criticized for the "shallow" female characters. Also that year, reviewing the same book for the Forbes portal, Ollie Barder was much more positive, noting that the series is "an epic space opera that needs to be read" and "a fascinating novel and essential reading for anyone that enjoys immaculately complex fiction". Rachel S. Cordasco, reviewing the novel series in Locus Magazine in 2020, praised the work as "a remarkable series... a multi-layered, multi-textual work [that] tells different stories on multiple levels", also observing that it is not just a space opera, but also, an "in-depth historiography" of the future military conflict, comparing it to the 18th-century historical work The History of the Decline and Fall of the Roman Empire.

In 2017, the 1988–1997 anime's official English release received a number of reviews in the English media. Anne Laurenroth of the Anime News Network gave a positive review, stating that despite its length, it has, arranged well in advance, "one of the most satisfying anime endings ever written". Daryl Surat, writing for Otaku Magazine, called the series "anime's greatest sci-fi epic".

Takumi Sato noted that the character of Reinhard von Lohengramm as depicted in the anime could be related to the "aestheticization of Hitler's image", comparing this phenomenon to similar Japanese works, such as Space Battleship Yamato.

The series has been described as "highly influential" in the development of Chinese online literature.

The historiographical aspects of the show have been analyzed by a Polish scholar, Arkadiusz Bożejewicz.

Notes

References

External links
 
 
 
 

 
Book series introduced in 1982
1988 anime films
1988 anime OVAs
1992 anime films
1993 anime films
1998 anime OVAs
Fiction set in the 4th millennium
Artland (company)
Crunchyroll anime
Fictional rivalries
Funimation
IG Port franchises
Japanese science fiction novels
Madhouse (company)
Magic Bus (studio)
Military anime and manga
Military science fiction novels
Novels by Yoshiki Tanaka
Production I.G
Science fiction book series
Seinen manga
Sentai Filmworks
Shueisha manga
Shueisha franchises
Shochiku
Shōjo manga
Shōnen manga
Space opera novels
Space opera anime and manga
Terrorism in fiction
Tokuma Shoten manga
Upcoming anime television series
Viz Media novels